The 1836 United States presidential election in Connecticut took place between November 3 and December 7, 1836, as part of the 1836 United States presidential election. Voters chose eight representatives, or electors to the Electoral College, who voted for President and Vice President.

Connecticut voted for the Democratic candidate, Martin Van Buren, over Whig candidate William Henry Harrison. Van Buren won Connecticut by a narrow margin of 1.3%.

As a result of his win, Van Buren also became the first Democratic presidential candidate to carry Connecticut.

Results

See also
 United States presidential elections in Connecticut

References

Connecticut
1836
1836 Connecticut elections